Rattleweed is a common name for several plants and may refer to:

Astragalus
Baptisia arachnifera, native to the United States
Crotalaria retusa, native to tropical Asia, Africa, and Australia
Senna covesii, native to the United States and Mexico

See also
Rattlebox
Rattlebush
Rattlepod